Imagawa Station (今川駅) is the name of two train stations in Japan:

 Imagawa Station (Niigata)
 Imagawa Station (Osaka)